Jawahar Nayak (born 10 January 1954) is an Indian politician and member of the Bharatiya Janata Party. He is a former member of the Madhya Pradesh Legislative Assembly from the Saria constituency from 1993 to 1998. Later, he was a candidate for the Chhattisgarh Legislative Assembly from the Kharsia constituency in Chhattisgarh.

References 

People from Raigarh district
Bharatiya Janata Party politicians from Chhattisgarh
Living people
Year of birth missing (living people)
Madhya Pradesh MLAs 1993–1998
Former members of Indian National Congress